Radio Shadhin is a Bangladeshi FM radio station, headquartered in Dhaka. It started broadcasting on 20 March 2013. It broadcasts all matches of Bangladesh National Cricket Team's home match.

References

2013 establishments in Bangladesh
Organisations based in Dhaka
Radio stations in Bangladesh
Mass media in Dhaka